Mictopsichia guatemalae is a species of moth of the family Tortricidae. It is found in Mexico, Panama, Guatemala and Colombia.

The wingspan is about 14 mm. The ground colour of the forewings is brownish orange, except for a basal and subapical streak and the dorsomedian area which is cream reticulated (net like) brown. The hindwings are orange, the markings of the apical area brownish divided into some spots.

Etymology
The name refers to the country of origin, Guatemala.

References

Moths described in 2009
Mictopsichia
Moths of South America
Moths of Central America
Taxa named by Józef Razowski